Lissotesta liratula is a species of sea snail, a marine gastropod mollusk in the superfamily Seguenzioidea.

Description
The height of the shell attains 1.1 mm.

Distribution
This species is found in Antarctic waters: Weddell Sea, Bellingshausen Sea at a depth of 500 m.

References

liratula
Gastropods described in 1903